Patrick Lyon of Auchterhouse (1669 – 13 November 1715) was a Scottish politician.

He was the second son of Patrick Lyon, 3rd Earl of Strathmore and Kinghorne and his wife Helen, daughter of John Middleton, 1st Earl of Middleton. He married his second cousin Margaret, daughter of James Carnegie of Finhaven, but they had no children.

He represented the barons of Forfarshire in the last Parliament of Scotland, 1702 to 1707. He was killed fighting on the Jacobite side at the Battle of Sheriffmuir.

References
Patrick Cracroft-Brennan, Strathmore and Kinghorne, Earl of (S, 1606). Retrieved 15 November 2011.
John Foster, Members of Parliament, Scotland (London and Aylesbury, 1882), p. 221

Shire Commissioners to the Parliament of Scotland
Members of the Parliament of Scotland 1702–1707
Politics of Angus, Scotland
Scottish soldiers
Scottish Jacobites
18th-century soldiers
18th-century Scottish politicians
18th-century Scottish people
Patrick
Younger sons of earls
1669 births
1715 deaths